Vosburg is a town 61 km west of Britstown, in the Northern Cape province of South Africa. The town has relatively low crime rate and features many 18th century buildings.

Town 100 km north-north-west of Victoria West, 70 km west of Britstown and 94 km north-east of Carnarvon. It was founded in 1895 and became a municipality in 1897. Named after the Vos family, who owned the farm on which it was laid out.

History 
The town was established on the farm Processfontein in 1895 and was named after Mr J Vos and the Van Rensburg family.

References

Populated places in the Kareeberg Local Municipality
Karoo
Populated places established in 1895
1895 establishments in the British Empire